Boris Ilyin (born 1930) is a Soviet sailor. He competed in the 12m² Sharpie event at the 1956 Summer Olympics.

References

External links
 

1930 births
Living people
Soviet male sailors (sport)
Olympic sailors of the Soviet Union
Sailors at the 1956 Summer Olympics – 12 m2 Sharpie
Place of birth missing (living people)